Ormiston Six Villages Academy (formerly Westergate Community School) is a coeducational secondary school for 11 to 16-year-old students (Y7-11) with academy status, located in Westergate, West Sussex, England.

The school converted to academy status on 1 November 2013 and is part of the Ormiston Academies Trust.

External links
Ormiston Six Villages Academy official website

Secondary schools in West Sussex
Academies in West Sussex
Ormiston Academies
Educational institutions established in 2013
2013 establishments in England